Boško Simonović (Serbian Cyrillic: Бoшкo Cимoнoвић; 12 February 1898 – 5 August 1965) was a football coach, player, referee, and administrator. His most notable feat was coaching the Kingdom of Yugoslavia national team at the first World Cup in 1930 in Uruguay.

Though an architect by vocation, Simonović never worked in the profession he was trained for, instead devoting his whole life to sports – particularly football.

He played football as a goalkeeper in SK Srpski mač and later in BSK. Following a playing career he became a football referee and was the first Serb to referee an international match, in 1923 in Bucharest. He retired from refereeing following a broken leg in a sledding accident.

References

1898 births
1965 deaths
People from Šid
Serbian footballers
Yugoslav footballers
Association football goalkeepers
OFK Beograd players
Serbian football managers
Yugoslav football managers
Yugoslavia national football team managers
1930 FIFA World Cup managers
FK Vojvodina managers